The Making of the Fittest: DNA and the Ultimate Forensic Record of Evolution is a science book by Sean B. Carroll, published in 2006. It is a general interest book on evolution, following on his two previous works Endless Forms Most Beautiful and From DNA to Diversity (an introductory text for biology graduate students). Carroll discusses specific examples of how evolutionary processes have played out in the development of selected species, and focuses on the pivotal function of changes in DNA sequences for understanding the history of natural selection. The book won the Phi Beta Kappa Award in Science.

Reception  
A review for the National Center for Science Education by Louise Mead states that the book "should be required reading for those teetering on the edge of accepting evolution, as well as anyone interested in learning more about the great epic of life", and that it provides evocative and powerful examples of how evolution works and why it matters. David McKinnon, writing for the Journal of Clinical Investigation, notes that the book is stylistically and conceptually similar to the works of Stephen Jay Gould, but based strongly on findings in molecular biology that were not yet available for Gould. He concluded that the book was "sufficiently comprehensive to make a good introduction to evolution for the lay reader or nonspecialist and is highly recommended".

References

2006 non-fiction books
Books about evolution